Red! (Dutch: Rood! or ROOD!) is a Flemish socialist political party in Belgium. It was founded in 2011 after some members of SP.A, led by Erik De Bruyn, left the Flemish social-democratic party. Red! Supports a social democratic welfare state, and opposes Neoliberalism and the Third Way policies endorsed by the SP.A. The party currently has no parliamentary representatives.

Party chairmen
 2011–2012: Erik De Bruyn
 2012–: Stephen Bouquin (spokesperson)

External links
 Official website

Flemish political parties in Belgium
Political parties established in 2011
Socialist parties in Belgium
2011 establishments in Belgium